Larry Richard Christenson (born November 10, 1953), nicknamed "L.C.", is an American former professional baseball pitcher, who played his entire Major League Baseball (MLB) career for the Philadelphia Phillies (1973–1983).

Early life

Christenson attended Marysville (WA) High School where he was noted more for his basketball than baseball skills. He struck out 143 batters in 72 innings and had an earned run average (ERA) of 0.28 in his senior year.

Career

He was selected third overall in the first round by the Phillies in the 1972 MLB draft just one day after his graduation. 

A short time later, he began his professional career with the Phillies’ Minor League Baseball (MiLB) Pulaski Phillies of the Appalachian League. Both his first MiLB and MLB hits were home runs and he is tied with Rick Wise for most home runs (11) by a pitcher in Phillies history.

Christenson made his MLB debut on April 13, 1973, beating the National League (NL)-rival New York Mets, 7–1, while pitching a complete game. At the time, he was the youngest player in MLB at age 19; he would remain so until 18-year-old David Clyde debuted for the Texas Rangers, that June 27.

Christenson would bounce back and forth from the majors to the minors until 1975, when the Phillies called him up to stay. He went 11–6 that season and would become a key cog on Phillies teams that would win three straight NL Eastern Division titles (1976–1978). Christenson would have his best seasons those three years: 1976, going 13–8 with a 3.68 earned run average (ERA); 1977 (his best season), when he went 19–6 with a 4.06 ERA, winning 15 of his last 16 decisions; and 1978, where he slipped to 13–14, despite posting a career-best ERA of 3.24. In the 1978 National League Championship Series, Christenson was the Phillies’ Game 1 starter.

Thereafter, injuries would begin to plague Christenson's career. He began the 1979 season on the disabled list (DL), with elbow problems, missing the first month. Later, that June, Christenson broke his collarbone during a charity bicycle ride and missed several weeks. He ended up with a 5–10 record that season. He was nearly dealt along with Tug McGraw and Bake McBride to the Texas Rangers for Sparky Lyle and Johnny Grubb at the 1979 Winter Meetings in Toronto, but the proposed transaction was never executed because a deferred money issue in Lyle's contract went unresolved.

In 1980, Christenson started off 3–0, but went on the DL, again, and had elbow surgery. He recovered to finish the season 5–1 and start Game 4 of the 1980 World Series, but was knocked out of the game in the first inning. In 1981, Christenson posted a less-than-stellar 4–7 record, but notched a win in the 1981 National League Division Series, against the Montreal Expos. His last injury-free season was 1982, when he made 32 starts and went 9–10. In 1983, Christenson went under the knife for elbow surgery for the final time, after a 2–4 start. He failed to make the postseason roster and the Phillies gave him his unconditional release on November 10 of that year, his 30th birthday.

Although only a .150 hitter (64-for-427) in his 11-year major league career, Christenson hit 11 home runs with 46 RBI and 24 bases on balls.

Christensen tried for several years, spent in his home state of Washington, to rehabilitate from his numerous surgeries, but was unable to return to baseball.

Personal life

He began a career in institutional investing in 1985, and currently is president of Christenson Investment Partners, which works with institutional asset managers and investors. Christenson resides in the Philadelphia area. He has two adult daughters; Claire and Libby. Christenson maintains his ties with the Phillies and is well known locally for his work on behalf of numerous charities.

References

 Kashatus, William C. Lefty & Tim: How Steve Carlton and Tim McCarver Became Baseball's Best Battery. Lincoln: University of Nebraska Press, 2022.

External links

Larry Christenson at Baseball Almanac
Larry Christenson at Baseball Biography
Larry Christenson at Baseball Gauge

1953 births
Major League Baseball pitchers
Baseball players from Washington (state)
Philadelphia Phillies players
Eugene Emeralds players
Pulaski Phillies players
Toledo Mud Hens players
Living people
People from Marysville, Washington